"I Wanna Hear It from You" is a song written by Nancy Montgomery and Rick Giles, and recorded by American country music artist Eddy Raven.  It was released in August 1985 as the second single from the album Love and Other Hard Times.  The song reached #8 on the Billboard Hot Country Singles & Tracks chart.

Chart performance

References

1985 singles
1985 songs
Eddy Raven songs
Song recordings produced by Paul Worley
RCA Records singles
Songs written by Rick Giles